is a former Japanese football player who last appeared for Blaublitz Akita.

Kamata previously played for Oita Trinita in J. League Division 1.

Club statistics
Updated to 23 February 2017.

References

External links

1982 births
Living people
Fukuoka University alumni
Association football people from Fukuoka Prefecture
Japanese footballers
J1 League players
J3 League players
Japan Football League players
Oita Trinita players
Gainare Tottori players
Matsumoto Yamaga FC players
Blaublitz Akita players
Association football midfielders
Akita FC Cambiare players